The Okinawans in Hawaii (Okinawan: ハワイ沖縄人, Hawai uchinānchu) are a Ryukyuan ethnic group, numbering anywhere between 45,000-50,000 people, or 3% of Hawaii’s total population.

History

Immigration 
The economy of Okinawa plummeted following its incorporation into Japan after 1879. As a result of worsening conditions, many Okinawans wished to move elsewhere for a better life. Previously, Japan had prohibited emigratIon from Okinawa Prefecture, but this decision was later reversed in the late 1890s. In 1899, the first group of Okinawan migrants were formed, numbering 26 people. Led by emigration activist Kyuzo Toyama, these laborers arrived in Hawaii on January 8, 1900. Subsequent waves of migrants came to Hawaii in the following years, with the second group, also led by Kyuzo, arriving in 1903. This group had 40 people.

Okinawa's declining economy was the main contributor of emigration, but other factors included the recession caused by the Russo-Japanese War and draft dodging.

Settlement 
While many Okinawans wanted to return home after making enough money in Hawaii, many also stayed behind and permanently settled. This caused the formation of the Okinawan community of Hawaii. By 1908, over 8,500 Hawaii residents were of Okinawan descent.

Okinawans in Hawaii faced discrimination by the local Japanese community, who saw them as backwards due to cultural and linguistic differences. Common insults included "pig-eater", and many customs such as the hajichi (Okinawan female tattoos) were made fun of.

Identity 
Because Okinawa used to be an independent country from Japan, many Okinawan migrants viewed themselves as a distinct group from the Yamato Japanese, or Naichi. The attitude of being a distinct group persists today among Hawaii Okinawans.

There are numerous cultural organizations for the Okinawans in Hawaii, the largest one being the Hawaii United Okinawa Association. As of 2020, it enrolls over 40,000 people across 50 different member clubs, each pertaining to a specific region in Okinawa.  Since the 1970s, the HUOA has held an annual Okinawan Cultural Festival.

Notable people 

 Ryan Higa, YouTuber
 David Ige, former governor of Hawaii
 Rob Kajiwara, Okinawan-Hawaiian political activist
 Yeiki Kobashigawa, Medal of Honor recipient (WW2)
 Herbert Matayoshi, former mayor of Hawaii county
 Shinyei Nakamine, Medal of Honor recipient (WW2)
 Robert Taira, restaurant owner
 Dwight Takamine, state senator
 Roy Yamaguchi, chef and entrepreneur
 Stephen K. Yamashiro, former mayor of Hawaii county

See also 

 Ryukyuan Americans
 Ryukyuan people
 Japanese in Hawaii

References 

Ryukyuan people
Ethnic groups in Hawaii
Japanese diaspora
Japanese-American culture in Hawaii